Amadou Diop (born 11 February 1953) is a Senegalese wrestler. He competed at the 1980 Summer Olympics and the 1984 Summer Olympics.

References

1953 births
Living people
Senegalese male sport wrestlers
Olympic wrestlers of Senegal
Wrestlers at the 1980 Summer Olympics
Wrestlers at the 1984 Summer Olympics
Place of birth missing (living people)
20th-century Senegalese people
21st-century Senegalese people